E.V. Day (born 1967, New York) is an American, New York-based installation artist and sculptor. Day's work explores themes of feminism and sexuality, while employing various suspension techniques and reflecting upon popular culture.

Education
Day received her MFA in Sculpture from Yale School of Art in 1995, and began her “Exploding Couture” series in 1999—the first installment of which, “Bombshell,” was included in the 2000 Whitney Biennial and is now in the museum’s permanent collection.

Awards
In 2016 she was awarded the Rome Prize in Visual Arts from The American Academy in Rome, Italy for the 2016-2017 fellow.

In 2011 she was awarded the Artpace Residency by the Linda Pace Foundation in San Antonio, Texas.

In 2010 she was awarded the Versailles Foundation Munn Artists program at Claude Monet's Garden in Giverny, France.

In 2007 she was awarded the Fellowship in Sculpture from the New York Foundation for the Arts.

Exhibitions
For “G-Force,” her 2001 solo exhibition at the Whitney Museum at Altria, Day suspended hundreds of resin-coated pairs of thong underwear from the ceiling in fighter-jet formations. In 2004, the Herbert F. Johnson Museum of Art at Cornell University mounted a ten-year survey of her work. In 2006, Day exhibited “Bride Fight”, a site-specific installation of two bridal gowns in mid-explosion, in the lobby of the Lever House on Park Avenue. That same year, the Santa Barbara Contemporary Arts Forum exhibited “Intergalactic Installations”, a solo exhibit of 3-D drawings in black light. In 2008, she was commissioned by the Whitney Museum to create “Bondage/Bandage” from a bandage dress by Hervé Léger. In 2009, she was commissioned by New York City Opera to create “Divas Ascending” at Lincoln Center from their vast wardrobe archival. In 2010, she was awarded the Versailles Foundation Munn Artists Program residency at Claude Monet’s Garden in Giverny, France resulting in “Seducers,” high-resolution scans of the reproductive organs of flowers and “Giverny,” digital prints of performance artist Kembra Pfahler in character in Monet’s Garden. In 2011, she was invited to the International Artist-In-Residence Program at Artpace, the Linda Pace Foundation in San Antonio, Texas where she began work on “CatFight,” two saber-toothed cat skeletons engaged in battle that became part of her solo exhibition “Semi Feral” at Mary Boone Gallery.  In 2013, she was invited to create a site specific installation and exhibition on Philip Johnson’s Glass House Estate, resulting in “SNAP!,” red rope nets capturing and securing the iconic “Da Monsta” building to the ground. In 2016, E.V. Day was commissioned by NASCAR legend Jimmie Johnson to create a sculpture using the fire suit he wore during his first Daytona 500 win. The resulting suspension sculpture "Daytona Vortex" was exhibited at The Mint Museum in Charlotte, North Carolina, in 2021.

Collections
E.V. Day is in numerous permanent collections including 

 the Museum of Modern Art 
 The National Museum of Women in the Arts 
 San Francisco Museum of Modern Art
 Whitney Museum of American Art 
 NASA
 The Lever House Art Collection 
 The New York Public Library 
 The New Museum for Contemporary Art 
 The Peter Norton Collection 
 The Progressive Corporation 
 Herbert F. Johnson Museum at Cornell University

References

1967 births
20th-century American sculptors
20th-century American women artists
Feminist artists
Living people
Yale School of Art alumni
Hampshire College alumni
21st-century American women
Sculptors from New York (state)
Artists from New York City
21st-century American sculptors